Steffi Graf defeated Anke Huber in the final, 6–1, 2–6, 6–1, 4–6, 6–3 to win the singles tennis title at the 1995 WTA Tour Championships. It was her fourth Tour Finals singles title.

Gabriela Sabatini was the defending champion, but lost in the second round to Natasha Zvereva.

Seeds

Note
 American Monica Seles had qualified but withdrew due to tendinitis in left knee and a sprained right ankle.

Main draw

Finals

See also
WTA Tour Championships appearances

References

Championships - Singles, 1995 Wta Tour
Singles 1995